Coles Local is a subsidiary of Coles Supermarkets in Australia, founded in November 2018 in Surrey Hills, Victoria as a way of expanding into the popular small format store market.

It has since expanded to fifteen sites in Victoria, New South Wales and Queensland. This includes the Balwyn North store, which opened in 1960 and was the site of the first Coles supermarket in Australia (but not the first Coles store, which opened in Collingwood in April 1914).

References

Coles Group
Retail companies established in 2018
Supermarkets of Australia
2018 establishments in Australia